Ian Fried may refer to:
 Ian Fried (screenwriter), American screenwriter
 Ina Fried, formerly Ian Fried, American journalist and former child actor